Arjun Kalyan (born 17 June 2002), is an Indian chess player. He has the title of Grandmaster, which FIDE awarded him in April 2021.

Chess career
Kalyan became an International Master (IM) in 2018. He attained his first Grandmaster norm at the Biel Chess Festival in Biel, Switzerland in July 2018. At the  International Chess Open held at Roquetas de Mar, Spain in January 2019, he would earn his second Grandmaster norm. Kalyan achieved his third and final norm in April 2019 at the Budapest Spring Festival in Budapest, Hungary. At the 2019 Under-18 World Championship held in Mumbai, India, Kalyan drew his last match against the top seeded player, enabling his fellow country grandmaster Rameshbabu Praggnanandhaa to win the title.

Personal life
Kalyan, a student at the Vellammal Vidyalaya, Chennai scored 93% in his Class X exams in 2018 despite having spent most of his time preparing for his next chess tournaments.

See also
 List of Indian chess players § International Masters
 Chess in India

References

External links

 
 
 

2002 births
Living people
Indian chess players
Sportspeople from Tamil Nadu
Sportspeople from Chennai
Chess grandmasters